This is a list of career achievements by André Greipel, a German former professional road bicycle racer, who rode professionally between 2002 and 2021. Greipel is noted as one of the best sprinters of his generation and is a winner of a number of one-day races and stage races. Greipel won 22 Grand Tour stages during his career; eleven at the Tour de France, seven at the Giro d'Italia and four at the Vuelta a España.

Major results

2003
 1st Grand Prix de Waregem
 1st Stage 1 Tour de Berlin
 1st Stage 2 Thüringen Rundfahrt der U23
 9th Rund um Düren
2004
 Grand Prix Guillaume Tell
1st Prologue & Stage 4b
 1st Stage 3 Tour du Loir-et-Cher
 1st Stage 1 Thüringen Rundfahrt der U23
 3rd Under-23 race, National Cyclo-cross Championships
 6th Grand Prix de Waregem
 9th Road race, UEC European Under-23 Road Championships
2005
 4th Memorial Rik Van Steenbergen
 4th Rund um die Nürnberger Altstadt
 10th Overall Danmark Rundt
1st Stage 6
2006
 Rheinland-Pfalz Rundfahrt
1st Stages 1 & 4
 Cologne Classic
1st Stages 1 & 2
 8th Münsterland Giro
2007
 Sachsen Tour
1st Stages 1 & 2
 4th Time trial, National Road Championships
2008
 1st  Overall Tour Down Under
1st  Points classification
1st Stages 2, 4, 5 & 6
 1st Down Under Classic
 1st Rund um die Nürnberger Altstadt
 1st Kampioenschap van Vlaanderen
 1st Münsterland Giro
 1st Stage 17 Giro d'Italia
 1st Stage 4 Tour of Austria
 1st Stage 4 Deutschland Tour
 3rd Nokere Koerse
 5th Overall Eneco Tour
1st Stage 2
 10th Overall Sachsen Tour
1st Stages 1 & 3
2009
 1st Paris–Bourges
 1st Neuseen Classics
 1st Philadelphia International Championship
 Vuelta a España
1st  Points classification
1st Stages 4, 5, 16 & 21
 Bayern Rundfahrt
1st Stages 1, 3 & 5
 Ster Elektrotoer
1st Stages 2, 3 & 5
 Tour of Austria
1st Stages 1, 6 & 8
 1st Stage 7 Tour de Pologne
 1st Stage 1 Tour Down Under
 1st Stage 1 Sachsen Tour
 4th Overall Four Days of Dunkirk
1st Stage 6
 4th Cancer Council Helpline Classic
 6th Münsterland Giro
2010
 1st  Overall Tour Down Under
1st  Sprints classification
1st Stages 1, 2 & 4
 1st Trofeo Magaluf-Palmanova
 Tour of Britain
1st Stages 1, 6 & 8
 Tour of Austria
1st  Points classification
1st Stages 1 & 6
 Tour de Pologne
1st Stages 2 & 7
 Eneco Tour
1st Stages 2 & 6
 Volta ao Algarve
1st  Points classification
1st Stage 2
 1st Stage 18 Giro d'Italia
 2nd Trofeo Cala Millor
 2nd Rund um Köln
 3rd Sparkassen Giro Bochum
 3rd Vattenfall Cyclassics
 8th Overall Tour of Turkey
1st  Points classification
1st Stages 1 (ITT), 2, 5, 6 & 8
2011
 Tour of Belgium
1st  Points classification
1st Stages 2 & 5
 Eneco Tour
1st Stages 1 & 2
 1st Stage 10 Tour de France
 1st Stage 4 Volta ao Algarve
 1st Stage 1 Three Days of De Panne
 1st Stage 6 Tour of Turkey
 2nd Memorial Rik Van Steenbergen
 2nd Kampioenschap van Vlaanderen
 3rd  Road race, UCI Road World Championships
 3rd Kuurne–Brussels–Kuurne
 4th Road race, National Road Championships
 4th Gent–Wevelgem
 7th Overall Tour Down Under
2012
 1st Down Under Classic
 1st ProRace Berlin
 1st Grand Prix Impanis-Van Petegem
 Tour de France
1st Stages 4, 5 & 13
 Tour of Belgium
1st  Points classification
1st Stages 1, 2 & 3
 Tour de Luxembourg
1st  Points classification
1st Stages 1 & 2
 Tour Down Under
1st Stages 1, 3 & 6
 Tour of Oman
1st Stages 1 & 4
 1st Stage 2 Tour of Turkey
 1st Stage 2 Ster ZLM Toer
 2nd Overall World Ports Classic
 2nd Vattenfall Cyclassics
 4th Memorial Rik Van Steenbergen
 5th Eschborn–Frankfurt – Rund um den Finanzplatz
 6th Overall Danmark Rundt
1st Stages 1 & 2
 10th Kuurne–Brussels–Kuurne
 10th Münsterland Giro
2013
 1st  Road race, National Road Championships
 1st Cancer Council Helpline Classic
 1st Ronde van Zeeland Seaports
 1st Brussels Cycling Classic
 Tour Down Under
1st Stages 1, 4 & 6
 Tour of Turkey
1st  Points classification
1st Stages 4 & 5
 Tour of Belgium
1st  Points classification
1st Stages 1 & 2
 1st Stage 6 Tour de France
 1st Stage 1 Tour Méditerranéen
 1st Stage 4 Eneco Tour
 2nd Overall Ster ZLM Toer
1st  Points classification
 2nd Vattenfall Cyclassics
 2nd Grand Prix de Fourmies
 3rd Eschborn–Frankfurt – Rund um den Finanzplatz
 3rd ProRace Berlin
 9th Grote Prijs Jef Scherens
2014
 1st  Road race, National Road Championships
 1st Brussels Cycling Classic
 1st Grote Prijs Jef Scherens
 1st Münsterland Giro
 Tour of Oman
1st  Points classification
1st Stages 1, 3 & 6
 Tour Down Under
1st Stages 4 & 6
 Tour de Luxembourg
1st Stages 1 & 4
 1st Stage 6 Tour de France
 1st Stage 4 Tour of Belgium
 1st Stage 4 Ster ZLM Toer
 2nd Down Under Classic
 7th Overall World Ports Classic
1st Stage 1
 10th Overall Tour of Qatar
1st Stage 5
2015
 1st  Overall Ster ZLM Toer
1st  Points classification
1st Stages 1 & 2
 1st Vattenfall Cyclassics
 Tour de France
1st Stages 2, 5, 15 & 21
Held  after Stages 2–7, 10
 Eneco Tour
1st  Points classification
1st Stage 2
 Tour de Luxembourg
1st  Points classification
1st Stages 1 & 3
 1st Stage 6 Giro d'Italia
 1st Stage 2 Paris–Nice
 1st Stage 4 Tour of Turkey
 1st Stage 7 Tour of Britain
 1st Stage 5 Volta ao Algarve
 2nd Trofeo Playa de Palma
 8th Trofeo Santanyi–Ses Salines-Campos
 10th Overall Three Days of De Panne
2016
 1st  Road race, National Road Championships
 1st Trofeo Felanitx-Ses Salines–Campos-Porreres
 1st Trofeo Playa de Palma
 Giro d'Italia
1st Stages 5, 7 & 12
Held  after Stages 7–12
 1st Stage 21 Tour de France
 1st Stage 1 Tour of Britain
 1st Stage 1 Tour de Luxembourg
 1st Stage 3 Presidential Tour of Turkey
 2nd Rund um Köln
 3rd Scheldeprijs
 10th EuroEyes Cyclassics
2017
 1st Trofeo Porreres-Felanitx–Ses Salines-Campos
 1st Omloop Eurometropool
 Volta ao Algarve
1st  Points classification
1st Stage 4
 Giro d'Italia
1st Stage 2
Held  after Stage 2
Held  after Stages 2–4
 1st Stage 5 Paris–Nice
 3rd Brussels Cycling Classic
 3rd Primus Classic
 3rd Münsterland Giro
 4th Trofeo Playa de Palma
 4th Omloop van het Houtland
 4th Paris–Tours
 5th EuroEyes Cyclassics
 7th Paris–Roubaix
2018
 Tour of Belgium
1st  Points classification
1st Stages 1 & 2
 Tour Down Under
1st Stages 1 & 6
 Tour of Britain
1st Stages 1 & 4
 2nd Overall Four Days of Dunkirk
1st Stages 2 & 5
 4th Road race, National Road Championships
 4th Münsterland Giro
 8th London–Surrey Classic
2019
 2nd Grote Prijs Stad Zottegem
 3rd Overall La Tropicale Amissa Bongo
1st Stage 6
 5th Trofeo Palma
 8th Kuurne–Brussels–Kuurne
2021
 1st Trofeo Alcúdia – Port d'Alcúdia
 1st Stage 4 Vuelta a Andalucía
 10th Münsterland Giro

Grand Tour general classification results timeline

References

Greipel